Sam Fletcher may refer to:

 Sam Fletcher (baseball) (1881–?), pitcher in Major League Baseball
 Sam Fletcher (soccer) (1890–1972), English footballer
 Sam Fletcher (singer) (1934–1989), American singer in the 1950s and 1960s
 Samuel Fletcher (merchant), a solicitor

See also
Samantha Fletcher
 Samuel Fletcher (died 1950), politician